The Schrader Bluff Formation is a geologic formation in Alaska. It preserves fossils dating back to the Cretaceous period,

Fossil remains include Inoceramus and Scaphites.

Originally named by George Gryc and others as the marine formation of the Colville Group (abandoned).

See also

 List of fossiliferous stratigraphic units in Alaska
 Paleontology in Alaska

References

Cretaceous Alaska